Pforzen is a municipality  in Ostallgäu, Bavaria.

Cemetery
Near Pforzen is an extended Alemannic cemetery that was in use from the 5th up to the 8th century. A total of 442 graves were excavated in two campaigns in 1991/2 and 1996. Two items bearing runic inscriptions were recovered, the Pforzen buckle in 1992 and an ivory ring in 1996.

References

Ostallgäu